Indian Police may refer to:

India
 Law enforcement in India
 Indian Police Service, which provides leaders and commanders to staff the state police forces and all-India Central Armed Police Forces. Its members are the senior officers of the police.
 Indian Imperial Police, the police force of the British Raj, disestablished in 1948.

Canada
 First Nations Policing Program (FNPP), administered by Public Safety Canada
 First Nations Community Policing Service of the Royal Canadian Mounted Police 
 Indigenous police in Canada

United States
 Bureau of Indian Affairs Police
 United States Indian Police
 Indian agency police
 Indian tribal police

See also
 Indian Police Force (web series), Indian cop drama